CKFF-FM is a First Nations community radio station that operates at 104.1 MHz (FM) in Kipawa, Quebec, Canada.

Branded as Drumbeat Radio, the station airs a variety of programs, interviews, stories, culture and music including country, rock, pop and more.

History

On November 13, 2018, Kebaowek First Nation (OBCI) received approval from the Canadian Radio-television and Telecommunications Commission (CRTC) to operate a new english-language Indigenous (Type B Native) FM radio programming in Kipawa, Quebec which would operate at 104.1 MHz (channel 281A) with an average effective radiated power (ERP) of 6,000 watts (non-directional antenna with an effective height of antenna above average terrain of 55.5 metres). 

The station signed on the air as Drumbeat Radio in April 2020.

References

External links
drumbeatradio.ca
CKFF-FM History - Canadian Communications Foundation

Kff
Kff
Kff
Radio stations established in 2020
2020 establishments in Quebec